Barry Todd Wilburn (born December 9, 1963) is a former professional American football player who was drafted by the Washington Redskins in the eighth round (219th overall) of the 1985 NFL Draft.  A 6'3", 186-lb. cornerback from the University of Mississippi, Wilburn played in eight NFL seasons from 1985 to 1996 (he missed two seasons due to injury) and in two CFL seasons for the Saskatchewan Roughriders and the British Columbia Lions. He played in one final season in 1999 for the Winnipeg Blue Bombers before retiring.

Professional career
Wilburn started in Super Bowl XXII for the Redskins, and recorded two interceptions in their 42-10 victory. Wilburn retired with 20 career interceptions and five fumble recoveries. He also won a Grey Cup title as a member of the 1994 BC Lions, making him one of only ten players to have won football championships on both sides of the border (Super Bowl and Grey Cup).

Personal life
Wilburn is the son of Olympic great, Margaret Matthews Wilburn and the father of Jordan and Dominique Wilburn, named for his two favorite NBA basketball players.

References

1963 births
Living people
American football cornerbacks
Canadian football defensive backs
BC Lions players
Cleveland Browns players
Ole Miss Rebels football players
Philadelphia Eagles players
Players of American football from Memphis, Tennessee
Players of Canadian football from Memphis, Tennessee
Saskatchewan Roughriders players
Washington Redskins players
Winnipeg Blue Bombers players